Venezuela competed at the 1976 Summer Olympics in Montreal, Quebec, Canada. 32 competitors, 23 men and 9 women, took part in 35 events in 6 sports.

Medalists

Athletics

Boxing

Cycling

Six cyclists represented Venezuela in 1976.

Individual road race
 Ramón Noriega — 5:03:13.0 (→ 53rd place)
 José Ollarves — 5:07:09.0 (→ 58th place)
 Justo Galaviz — did not finish (→ no ranking)
 Nicolas Reidtler — did not finish (→ no ranking)

Team time trial
 José Ollarves
 Justo Galaviz
 Jesús Escalona
 Serafino Silva

Diving

Judo

Swimming

References

External links
Official Olympic Reports
International Olympic Committee results database

Nations at the 1976 Summer Olympics
1976 Summer Olympics
1976 in Venezuelan sport